Zlatan Alomerović (born 15 June 1991) is a Serbian professional footballer who plays as a goalkeeper for Jagiellonia Białystok.

Early life 
Alomerović was born in Prijepolje, in southwestern Serbia (still SFR Yugoslavia at the time). He arrived in Germany in 1999 at the age of eight with his family and grew up in Ruhr in North Rhine-Westphalia. He holds both a German passport and Serbian passport; he gained a German passport via the support of BVB.

Club career

Borussia Dortmund
In 1999, following Alomerović's emigration to Germany from the former Yugoslavia, Alomerović was enrolled into the academy of TuS Heven and then he was enrolled for one year at the academy of SV Bommern 05 and the academy of SV Herbede before being enrolled at the academy of FSV Witten until the end of the 2005–06 season. In the 2006–07 season, Alomerović was enrolled into the Borussia Dortmund academy.

In the 2010–11 season, Alomerović graduated from the BVB academy to the Borussia Dortmund II where he played in the Regionalliga. On 19 March 2011, Alomerović played his only game for Borussia Dortmund II in the 2010–11 season in a Borussia Dortmund II 2–2 draw with the second team of Fortuna Düsseldorf. In the 2011–12 season, the new Borussia Dortmund II manager David Wagner made some system changes and changes of goalkeepers after every second game; then Alomerović played his first match under David Wagner in Borussia Dortmund II's 4–0 away win over the second team of Schalke 04.

In the 2012–13 season, on 21 July 2012 Alomerović played his first match of the 2012–13 3. Liga season for Borussia Dortmund II and made his professional football debut in the German 3. Liga against VfL Osnabrück. On 18 May 2013, Alomerović played his second match of the 2012–13 season for Borussia Dortmund II in a 1–0 away win over VfB Stuttgart II and at the end of the 2012–13 season, Alomerović was inducted into the Borussia Dortmund first team for the 2013–14 Bundesliga season and Alomerović signed a one-year contract extension with Borussia Dortmund until 30 June 2014.

Korona Kielce
On 8 July 2017 he signed a contract with Ekstraklasa side Korona Kielce.

Honours 
Borussia Dortmund
DFL-Supercup: 2014

Lechia Gdańsk
Polish Cup: 2018–19
Polish Super Cup: 2019

References

External links
 
 
 

1991 births
Living people
People from Prijepolje
German people of Bosnia and Herzegovina descent
Serbian footballers
German footballers
Association football goalkeepers
Borussia Dortmund II players
Borussia Dortmund players
1. FC Kaiserslautern players
Lechia Gdańsk players
Lechia Gdańsk II players
Korona Kielce players
Jagiellonia Białystok players
Regionalliga players
3. Liga players
Ekstraklasa players
German expatriate footballers
Serbian expatriate footballers
Expatriate footballers in Poland
German expatriate sportspeople in Poland
Serbian expatriate sportspeople in Germany
Expatriate footballers in Germany